Grant Lawrence (born July 30, 1971) is a Canadian broadcaster, musician and writer based in Vancouver, primarily associated with CBC Music and CBC Radio 3. Lawrence was also the vocalist for the indie rock group The Smugglers.

Work
In addition to his regular shifts on Radio 3 itself, Lawrence was the host of Radio 3's Saturday night program on the CBC Radio 2 network until March 17, 2007, when that program was discontinued, and was also regular host of the service's monthly podcast. Spin magazine dubbed it the best podcast in Canada. In 2012, he also hosted the summer series The Wild Side on CBC Radio One, and became the host of the CBC Music Top 20 in 2020.

Lawrence began his association with the CBC in the 1990s, filing stories about life on tour with the Smugglers for David Wisdom's show Night Lines. When Nightlines ended in 1997, Wisdom and Leora Kornfeld, the former host of RealTime, went on to host the new series RadioSonic. Lawrence initially worked for the show as a researcher, and later became a producer, and became host of RadioSonic in 2001 after Wisdom and Kornfeld left the program.

In the summer of 2013, Lawrence and director Brent Hodge did a cross-country tour called The Beetle Roadtrip Sessions, which was distributed as a web series on CBC Music and other streaming video sites. It followed Lawrence across Canada visiting various musicians and other personalities along the way, including the Darcys, Hollerado, Sam Roberts, Theo Fleury, Hawksley Workman and others. The Beetle Roadtrip Sessions won an award for Best Original Program or Series produced for Digital Media – Non-Fiction at the 2nd Canadian Screen Awards.

Lawrence published his first book, Adventures in Solitude: What Not to Wear to a Nude Potluck and Other Stories from Desolation Sound, in 2010. A memoir of his visits to the Desolation Sound area of British Columbia, the book was a shortlisted nominee for the 2011 Hilary Weston Writers' Trust Prize for Nonfiction and the 2011 Edna Staebler Award.

Lawrence published his second book, The Lonely End of the Rink: Confessions of a Reluctant Goalie, in 2013. Both books won the BC Book Prize for Book of the Year in their respective years.

His third book, Dirty Windshields: The Best and the Worst of the Smugglers Tour Diaries, was published in 2017.

Personal life
He is married to singer-songwriter Jill Barber.

Lawrence co-founded and currently plays hockey for the Vancouver Flying Vees, an amateur hockey team staffed largely by Canadian musicians.

References

External links
 

1971 births
Living people
Musicians from Vancouver
Canadian indie rock musicians
Canadian rock singers
Canadian podcasters
Writers from Vancouver
CBC Radio hosts
21st-century Canadian non-fiction writers
21st-century Canadian male writers
Canadian memoirists
Canadian male non-fiction writers
21st-century Canadian male singers
21st-century memoirists